

Marzieh Vafamehr is an Iranian independent filmmaker, actress, social and women's rights activist living in Tehran. She has been active in the One Million Signatures campaign in Iran for more than twenty years.
She is married to the great master in cinema, photographer, film director and screenwriter Nasser Taghvai. Vafamehr was arrested on 29 June 2011, reportedly due to her acting in Granaz Moussavi's 2009 Iranian-Australian film My Tehran for Sale that is critical of her native Iran. She was released on 24 October 2011, after posting unspecified bail. It was reported that she was sentenced to 90 lashes and a year in prison for appearing in the movie as an actress whose work is banned by the Iranian authorities. On 27 October 2011, Amnesty International reported that an Iranian appeals court had reduced Vafamehr's prison sentence to three months and overturned the flogging sentence. Eventually Vafamehr was released after 118 days from Qarchak Prison, but she was banned from making or playing in films and any forms of cultural activities as well as from leaving Iran.
She is the first Iranian woman who acted in cinema without the hijab after the Iranian revolution .She is the first Iranian woman who published the picture of her romantic kiss with Nasser Taghvai  in Nowruz 2013. She was one of the founding members of the "Women's Citizenship Center"  NGO in 2013.
She is an activist for realizing the revolution of woman, life, freedom

Filmography

Actress
 Gaze
 Belly's Suction by Pourya Moradi
The Cancer Period by Hossein Shahabi
 My Tehran for Sale by Granaz Moussavi
 The Bitter Tea by Nasser Taghvai
 Zangi and Roomi by Nasser Taghvai
 Wind, Ten Years Old by Marzieh Vafamehr
 Barefoot In Heaven
 play- written by Alireza Hanifi 
 Galilei –play-written by Bertolt Brecht 
 Rose Tattoo –play-written by Tennessee Williams 
 Wiggily-play- in Connecticut written by J.D. Salinger 
 and Good Bye-play- written by Athol Fugard 
 e Choobineh –play-written by Siamak Taghipour 
 in Paradise a feature directed by Bahram Tavakolli

Director
Nabat
Wind,ten years old
Crossed Out
Doll House
Station

References

External links 
 
Marzieh Vafamehr Official Website (Archived)
Marzieh Vafamehr S letter of protest
Her Photos
Top Ten In Sundance 2008

Living people
Iranian film actresses
Iranian stage actresses
University of Tehran alumni
Iranian women film directors
Year of birth missing (living people)